Dasycondylus is a genus of flowering plants in the family Asteraceae.

Species
All the known species are native to South America, all but one endemic to Brazil.
 Dasycondylus debeauxii (B.L.Rob.) R.M.King & H.Rob. - Paraná, Rio de Janeiro, São Paulo
 Dasycondylus dusenii R.M.King & H.Rob.	- Paraná 
 Dasycondylus hirsutissimus (Baker) R.M.King & H.Rob. - Bahia
 Dasycondylus lobbii (Klatt) R.M.King & H.Rob. - Bolivia, Peru, Brazil
 Dasycondylus platylepis (Baker) R.M.King & H.Rob. - Goiás
 Dasycondylus regnellii R.M.King & H.Rob. - Minas Gerais
 Dasycondylus resinosus (Spreng.) R.M.King & H.Rob. - Paraná, Rio de Janeiro, São Paulo, Espirito Santo
 Dasycondylus riedelii R.M.King & H.Rob.Paraná – Minas Gerais

References

Eupatorieae
Asteraceae genera
Flora of South America